The Cold Springs Station Site, west of Austin, Nevada, is a historic stagecoach station site that was active during 1861-1869 as a passenger and freight station, and later for freight.  Only stone ruins remain.  Nearby is the location of the original Cold Springs Pony Express Station Ruins.

Also known as the Rock Creek Stage Station, the site was listed on the National Register of Historic Places in 1972;  the listing included .

See also
 Cold Springs Pony Express Station Ruins

References 

Ghost towns in Churchill County, Nevada
Transport infrastructure completed in 1861
National Register of Historic Places in Churchill County, Nevada
National Register of Historic Places in Nevada
1861 establishments in Nevada Territory
Stagecoach stations on the National Register of Historic Places in Nevada
Stagecoach stations in Nevada